The Cello Sonata No. 2 in F major, Op. 99, was written by Johannes Brahms in 1886, more than twenty years after completing his Sonata No. 1. It was first published in 1887.  It was written for, dedicated to and first performed by Robert Hausmann, who had popularised the First Sonata, and who would the following year be given the honour of premiering the Double Concerto in A minor with Joseph Joachim.

Musical description
There are four movements:

First movement
The Allegro vivace is a sonata form opening with a fragmented cello theme over a tremolo piano part.

Second movement
Adagio affettuoso, with the cello part opening in a pizzicato exposition of the main theme over piano chords. The central section is in F minor.

Third movement
Allegro passionato in F minor, with a more songlike trio section in F major.

Fourth movement
Allegro molto; a rondo.

Notes

External links
 
 Performance of Cello Sonata No. 2 by Wendy Warner (cello) and Irina Nuzova (piano) from the Isabella Stewart Gardner Museum in MP3 format

1886 compositions
Brahms 2
Cello sonata 2
Compositions in F major